Blachea is a genus of eels in the family Congridae.

Species
There are currently two recognized species in this genus:

 Blachea longicaudalis Karmovskaya, 2004
 Blachea xenobranchialis Karrer & D. G. Smith, 1980 (Frillgill conger)

References

Congridae